2013 Rugby League World Cup Group D is one of the four groups in the 2013 Rugby League World Cup. The group comprises Cook Islands, United States and Wales.

Table

All times are local – UTC+0/GMT.

United States vs Cook Islands

Wales vs United States

Wales vs Cook Islands

Wales vs Italy (Inter-group)

Note: The match between Wales and Italy was an additional inter-group match.

Tonga vs Cook Islands (Inter-group)

Note: The match between Tonga and Cook Islands is an additional inter-group match.

Scotland vs United States (Inter-group)

Note: The match between Scotland and United States is an additional inter-group match.

References

External links

2013 Rugby League World Cup